An anti-submarine missile  is a standoff anti-submarine weapon. Often a variant of anti-ship missile designs, an anti-submarine systems typically use a jet or rocket engine, to deliver an explosive warhead aimed directly at a submarine, a depth charge, or a homing torpedo that is carried from a launch ship, or other  platform, to the vicinity of a target.

History

Depth charges were the earliest weapons designed for use by ships against submerged submarines. These explosives were initially dropped as the ship moved over the presumed location of a submarine. Before World War II, shipboard sonar was unable to maintain contact with a submarine at close range.

Various mortar-type projectors, including Hedgehog and Squid, were devised during World War II to allow a ship to maintain sonar contact while lobbing explosive charges toward the submarine.

During the Cold War, missiles were developed to provide greater range with reduced recoil. Some missiles and rockets, such as Hong Sang Eo (Red Shark) carry homing torpedoes to provide terminal guidance for the warhead.

The advantage of an anti-submarine missile is the attack stand-off range. The Swedish Bofors 375mm m/50 Anti-Submarine Warfare (ASW) rockets, in the past commonly used by Sweden, France, Japan and Germany for instance, can travel as far as 3600m depending on the rocket used. The USSR developed its own anti-submarine rockets in the RBU series and these are still in use in Russia and in countries using Russian designed ships. Today anti-submarine rockets have been phased out in most western navies, replaced by the Homing ASW Torpedo.

Examples
 Australia
Ikara
 France
Malafon
India
SMART
 Italy
Otomat#MILAS
 Japan
Type 07 Vertical Launch Anti-submarine rocket
 Norway
Terne ASW
 People's Republic of China
CJ-1 Torpedo
CY Series
 South Korea
Hong Sang Eo (Red Shark)
Soviet Union/Russian Federation
85RU
RPK-2 Vyuga
86R
88R  
RPK-1 Vikhr
RPK-9 Medvedka
Metel Anti-Ship Complex
3M-54 Kalibr
United Kingdom/Australia
Ikara
 United States
RUM-139 VL-ASROC
RUR-5 ASROC
UUM-44 SUBROC

References

Anti-submarine warfare
Anti-submarine missiles
Anti-submarine weapons
Missile types
Guided missiles